Oxyporhamphus is a genus of halfbeaks from the family Hemiramphidae. This genus contains two species, one in the warmer waters of the Atlantic and the other in the Indo-Pacific region.

Species 
 Oxyporhamphus micropterus (Valenciennes, 1847) (Bigwing halfbeak) - Indo-Pacific
 Oxyporhamphus similis Bruun, 1935 (False halfbeak) - Atlantic

References 

 
Hemiramphidae